Luigi d'Apera (died 1520) was a Roman Catholic prelate who served as Bishop of Terni (1509–1520).

Biography
In September 1509, Luigi d'Apera was appointed by Pope Julius II as Bishop of Terni. 
He served as Bishop of Terni until his death in 1520.

References

External links and additional sources
 (for Chronology of Bishops) 
 (for Chronology of Bishops) 

16th-century Italian Roman Catholic bishops
1520 deaths
Bishops appointed by Pope Julius II